EFTA is the European Free Trade Association, a trade organisation and free trade area.

EFTA may also refer to:

 European Fair Trade Association, an association of eleven fair trade importers
 European Federation of Taiwanese Associations

See also
 Free trade areas in Europe